Lavonna Dawn Morrell (born July 30, 1949) is an American politician and nurse who served as a member of the Washington House of Representatives from the 25th Legislative District. She works as a critical care nurse at MultiCare Good Samaritan Hospital in Puyallup.

Career
Morrell was first elected to the Washington House of Representatives in November 2002 and was subsequently re-elected in 2004, 2006 and 2008. Morrell's district included the cities of Puyallup and Fife and the unincorporated Pierce County communities of South Hill, Summit, and Waller.

She was defeated by Hans Zeiger in 2010 by a 47-vote margin, but returned to the House after her election in 2012. She lost re-election in 2014 to Melanie Stambaugh.

Morrell was the chair of the Appropriations Subcommittee on Health and Human Services in the House. She was also on the Appropriations, Health Care & Wellness, and Technology & Economic Development Committees. During her tenure, Morrell also served as both Majority Caucus Chair and Deputy Majority Whip in the State House.

References

1949 births
Living people
Democratic Party members of the Washington House of Representatives
Women state legislators in Washington (state)
American women nurses
People from Blackfoot, Idaho
Politicians from Puyallup, Washington
University of Washington School of Nursing alumni
21st-century American women